WINLAB, WIN-LAB or Wireless Information Networking Laboratory can refer to:
 WINLAB (Rutgers University), at Rutgers University in the United States
 WINLAB (Yeungnam University), at Yeungnam University in South Korea